Kuldeep of Kuldip Singh may refer to:

 Kuldeep Singh (cricketer) (born 1997), Filipino cricketer
 Kuldeep Singh (actor) (born 1985), Indian Hindi-language television actor
 Kuldeep Singh (music director), music director for Hindi films and plays
 Kuldeep Singh (wrestler) (born 1966), Indian wrestler
 Kuldip Singh (judge) (born 1932), Indian attorney and Supreme Court judge
 Kuldip Singh (architect) (1934–2020), Indian architect 
 Kuldip Singh Chandpuri (1940–2018), Indian Army officer
 Kuldip Singh Gosal (born 1946), Hong Kong-Canadian field hockey player